The 2021 Camellia Bowl was a college football bowl game played on December 25, 2021, at the Cramton Bowl in Montgomery, Alabama. The eighth edition of the Camellia Bowl, the game featured the Georgia State Panthers of the Sun Belt Conference and the Ball State Cardinals of the Mid-American Conference. The game began at 1:30 p.m. CST and aired on ESPN. It was one of the 2021–22 bowl games concluding the 2021 FBS football season. Sponsored by tax preparation software company TaxAct, the game was known as the TaxAct Camellia Bowl.

Teams
Consistent with conference tie-ins, the game was played between teams from the Sun Belt Conference and Mid-American Conference (MAC).

This was the third meeting between Georgia State and Ball State; entering the game, the all-time series was tied at 1–1.

Georgia State Panthers

Ball State Cardinals

Game summary

Statistics
Team statistics
Individual statistics

References

External links
 Game statistics at statbroadcast.com

Camellia Bowl
Camellia Bowl
Ball State Cardinals football bowl games
Georgia State Panthers football bowl games
Camellia Bowl
Camellia Bowl